Michael Stuart Symon (born 21 February 1965) is an Australian politician who was elected to the Australian House of Representatives at the 2007 federal election as the Australian Labor Party member for the federal seat of Deakin. He had previously been an electrician and was Occupational Health and Safety Officer of the Electrical Trades Union.

He defeated the sitting Liberal member, Phil Barresi, who had held the seat since 1996.  The seat had been one of the most marginal Liberal seats in the country for almost three decades.  Barresi led for most of the night, but on the fifth count a large flow of Green preferences allowed Symon to become only the second Labor MP in the seat's 70-year history.  At the 2010 election, Symon faced Barresi again, and was reelected with a slight swing in his favour—again due to Green preferences.

At the 2013 federal election, Symon suffered a swing of 3.8% against him and was defeated by Liberal candidate Michael Sukkar.

Symon currently serves as the Jubilee Ward councillor at the City of Maroondah; he had previously served as Councillor in the former Mullum Ward from 2016-2020 and was the municipality's Deputy Mayor in 2017/18 and Mayor in 2019/20.

References

External links
Personal website

1965 births
Living people
Australian Labor Party members of the Parliament of Australia
Members of the Australian House of Representatives
Members of the Australian House of Representatives for Deakin
Australian electricians
Australian trade unionists
21st-century Australian politicians
People from Box Hill, Victoria
Politicians from Melbourne